is a Japanese football player who plays for Ococias Kyoto AC.

Club statistics
Updated to 23 February 2018.

1Includes Playoffs J2/J3.

References

External links
 
 Profile at Blaublitz Akita

1984 births
Living people
Association football people from Chiba Prefecture
Japanese footballers
J1 League players
J2 League players
J3 League players
Yokohama F. Marinos players
Thespakusatsu Gunma players
Mito HollyHock players
Tochigi SC players
Blaublitz Akita players
Association football defenders